Telița is a commune in Anenii Noi District, Moldova. It is composed of two villages, Telița and Telița Nouă.

References

Communes of Anenii Noi District
Populated places on the Dniester